Willochra may refer to:

Willochra Creek, river in South Australia
 The Willochra Plain east of Port Augusta in South Australia
 Willochra, South Australia, a locality in South Australia
Anglican Diocese of Willochra, South Australia
RMS Fort Victoria, formerly named Willochra